Circle Pines is a city in Anoka County, Minnesota, United States. The population was 5,025 at the 2020 census.

Geography

Lake Drive / County 23 serves as a main route in the community.  Interstate 35W is in close proximity to the city.  Circle Pines is approximately 17 miles from the heart of the Minneapolis-Saint Paul metro area.

Rice Creek flows through the city.

Education
Centennial Schools (Independent School District #12) serves the community of Circle Pines and the surrounding cities of Blaine, Lino Lakes, Centerville, and Lexington.  Children in Circle Pines attend Centennial Elementary, Rice Lake Elementary, Blue Heron Elementary, or Golden Lake Elementary before continuing their education at Centennial Middle School and Centennial High School.

Governance
Circle Pines is a Plan A statutory city under Minnesota law.  The Circle Pines mayor is elected for a two-year term and city council members for a four-year term.

The current Mayor of Circle Pines is Dave Bartholomay.  Current council members include Steve McChesney, Dean Goldberg, Jennifer Rauner and Matt Percy.  The current City Administrator is Patrick Antonen, who is responsible for running the city on a day-to-day basis.

Notes
Circle Pines is served by the Centennial School District, the Centennial Lakes Police Department, and the Centennial Fire Department.

Circle Pines was ranked as the third most perfect suburb to live in by CNBC in 2011 based on housing, education, crime, and employment.

History
Circle Pines was founded as a planned cooperative community in which homeowners owned equal shares in the cooperative association which owned and developed the community. The name was selected because the cooperative movement in the United States in the 1940s used a circle encompassing two pine trees as its symbol. Although the community is no longer governed as a co–op, a municipally–owned gas utility remains as an operational memorial to Circle Pines' community heritage.

The Gibas family were one of the original families of the Circle Pines cooperative.  Their papers offer further insight into the origins of Circle Pines, Minnesota. Articles and speeches, news clippings, correspondence, and photographs are available for research use.

Demographics

2010 census
As of the census of 2010, there were 4,918 people, 2,006 households, and 1,349 families living in the city. The racial makeup of the city was 92.0% White, 1.8% African American, 0.4% Native American, 3.2% Asian, 0.4% from other races, and 2.1% from two or more races. Hispanic or Latino of any race were 2.0% of the population.

There were 2,006 households, of which 29.1% had children under the age of 18 living with them, 53.1% were married couples living together, 9.0% had a female householder with no husband present, 5.1% had a male householder with no wife present, and 32.8% were non-families. 26.4% of all households were made up of individuals, and 8.6% had someone living alone who was 65 years of age or older. The average household size was 2.45 and the average family size was 2.96.

The median age in the city was 40.5 years. 21.4% of residents were under the age of 18; 8.3% were between the ages of 18 and 24; 25.5% were from 25 to 44; 32.8% were from 45 to 64; and 12% were 65 years of age or older. The gender makeup of the city was 49.0% male and 51.0% female.

2000 census
As of the census of 2000, there were 4,663 people, 1,697 households, and 1,281 families living in the city. The racial makeup of the city was 96.01% White, 0.24% African American, 0.56% Native American, 1.74% Asian, 0.19% from other races, and 1.27% from two or more races. Hispanic or Latino of any race were 0.97% of the population.

There were 1,697 households, out of which 39.4% had children under the age of 18 living with them, 62.8% were married couples living together, 8.8% had a female householder with no husband present, and 24.5% were non-families. 19.8% of all households were made up of individuals, and 5.2% had someone living alone who was 65 years of age or older.  The average household size was 2.75 and the average family size was 3.19.

In the city, the population was spread out, with 28.1% under the age of 18, 7.0% from 18 to 24, 31.6% from 25 to 44, 24.3% from 45 to 64, and 9.0% who were 65 years of age or older.  The median age was 38 years. For every 100 females, there were 99.2 males.  For every 100 females age 18 and over, there were 94.8 males.

The median income for a household in the city was $60,469, and the median income for a family was $70,670. Males had a median income of $43,008 versus $29,837 for females. The per capita income for the city was $25,438.  About 1.2% of families and 2.3% of the population were below the poverty line, including 2.8% of those under age 18 and 4.9% of those age 65 or over.

Notable people
 Mystery Science Theater 3000 writer/actress Mary Jo Pehl grew up in Circle Pines, and the city is mentioned in several episodes of the show. 
 30 Rock actor Scott Adsit was born in Circle Pines.
 Professional Fighters League mixed martial artist Kaitlin Young was born in Circle Pines.

References

External links
 

Cities in Anoka County, Minnesota
Cities in Minnesota